The Konter Cliffs are a line of cliffs,  high, which surmount the east side of the terminus of Frostman Glacier, on the coast of Marie Byrd Land, Antarctica. They were mapped by the United States Geological Survey from surveys and U.S. Navy tricamera aerial photographs, 1959–65 and named by the Advisory Committee on Antarctic Names for Richard W. Konter, a member of the ship's party on board the City of New York during the Byrd Antarctic Expedition, 1928–30.

References

Cliffs of Marie Byrd Land